List of Association football clubs in Palau.

2014 Teams
Teams that competed in the 2014 Palau Soccer League:

 Kramers FC - Champions in 2008.
 Lyon FC
 New Stars FC
 Surangel Kings
 Team Friendship

Defunct Teams
Teams that have competed in previous seasons of the Palau Soccer League:
 Belau Kanu Club
 Biib Strykers
 Daewoo Ngatpang - Champions in 2004 and 2010. Not known whether they competed in any other seasons.
 Melekeok FC - Champions in 2009. Not known if they competed in any other seasons, though they definitely did not compete in either 2004, 2006-07 or 2010 seasons.
 Mount Everest Nepal - Known to have competed in 2004 and 2006-07 seasons.
 Palau Tiger Team - Known to have competed in the 2006-07 season.
 Palau Track and Field Team - Known to have competed in the 2004 season.
 Surangel and Sons Company - Champions in 2006
 Taj FC - Known as Mason's Taj during the 2012 Spring League, and champions during the 2012 Fall League
 Team Bangladesh - Three times champions in 2005, 2007 and in the 2012 Spring League and most successful team in Palau.
 Universal Peace Foundation - Known to have competed in the 2004 season.

All-time Palau Soccer League champions

References

Palau
 
Football clubs
Football clubs